Bashir Ahmad (born 10 June 1967) is a Pakistani sprinter. He competed in the men's 4 × 400 metres relay at the 1988 Summer Olympics.

References

External links

1967 births
Living people
Athletes (track and field) at the 1988 Summer Olympics
Pakistani male sprinters
Olympic athletes of Pakistan
Commonwealth Games competitors for Pakistan
Athletes (track and field) at the 1990 Commonwealth Games
Place of birth missing (living people)
20th-century Pakistani people